Milk and Money is a 1936 Warner Bros. Looney Tunes animated short film directed by Tex Avery. The short was released on October 3, 1936, and stars Porky Pig.

Plot
A farmer is busy with hoeing while his son Porky is ploughing the fields with his horse Dobbin. Hank Horsefly speeds up the process. The farmer and Porky are about to take a turn for the worse as Mr. Viper the Snake comes with a mortgage form ready to evict them unless a sum of rent money is paid.

Porky applies for a job as a driving milkman with a strict condition not to break a single bottle. Porky is doing well until Hank, having followed their trail, sends Dobbin at full speed and to crash and cause all the milk bottles to break.

As Porky despairs, Dobbin accidentally enters a horse race. When the race starts, Dobbin isn't getting far, until Hank stings Dobbin and he overtakes every racer and wins a $10,000 prize. Porky makes it to the farm in the nick of time, riding in a roofless limo, to pay the owed money to Mr. Viper.

Cast
 Billy Bletcher as Mr. Viper
 Joe Dougherty as Porky Pig, Porky's Papa

References

External links

Looney Tunes shorts
1936 animated films
1936 films
Films directed by Tex Avery
1930s American animated films
Porky Pig films
American black-and-white films
Films scored by Carl Stalling
1930s animated short films